is a Japanese illustrator. His works include both light novel illustration and anime character design. His major works include the character designer of the Hanasaku Iroha anime and character designer for the Arland Atelier game series, as well as being the illustrator of the Heaven's Memo Pad light novel series.

Works

Anime

Video games

Artbooks
Traditional White
Fruits Gift

Other
22/7 (Original Character Designer for Tsubomi Hiragi and Sumika Orihara)

References

External links
  
 

1983 births
Japanese illustrators
Living people
People from Nagoya